Melmerby may refer to:
Melmerby, Cumbria, England
Melmerby, Harrogate, North Yorkshire, England
Melmerby, Richmondshire, North Yorkshire, England